The State Prison at Nr. Snede is a prison located at Nr. Snede in Denmark. The location where the prison now stand was once the site of a girl home but has been a prison since 1943.

Capacity 
The State Prison at Nr. Snede has an open unit with a capacity of 75, a closed unit with a capacity of 85 and a special unit for penalty and isolation with a capacity of 15. The prison mostly receive male prisoners from Zealand and the Copenhagen area in spite of this prison's geographical location in Jutland.

Employment 
The prisoners in the open section mainly works with maintenance, carpentry, animal keeping and assembly work. Prisoners in the closed section mainly works with maintenance and assembly work.

Education Programs 
The prisoners in the prison can attend either Preparatory Adult Education (in Danish and Mathematics), General Adult Education (in Danish, IT, Mathematics, English), Special Education for dyslexic people, refresher courses (in Danish and Mathematics for Technical school), various courses in sports, cooking and cost theory as well as courses in AutoCad.

Treatment Programs 
The prison offers drug rehabilitation, cognitive proficiency and anger management programs to prisoners.

External reference 
The State Prison at Nr. Snede - The Prisons own website
The State Prison at Nr. Snede - The Danish Prison and Probation Service website

Prisons in Denmark
Government buildings completed in 1943
1943 establishments in Denmark